= Snehasparsham (scheme) =

Social welfare scheme for unwed mothers

Snehasparsham is a social welfare scheme by the Social Justice Department of Government of Kerala for protecting unwed mothers. Under this scheme, a financial assistance of ₹1000 is given to unwed mothers below 65 years of age, residing in Kerala. To qualify for this scheme, the beneficiary should not be a recipient of any other pension schemes of the government. As of 2024, there are 1162 beneficiaries under this scheme. As of 2021, approximately ₹ 3 crores were spent by the government as a part of this scheme.
